Javier Fuchslocher Baeza (born 1989) is a Chilean teacher who was elected as a member of the Chilean Constitutional Convention.

References

External links
 

Living people
1989 births
21st-century Chilean politicians
Non-Neutral Independents politicians
University of Bío-Bío alumni
Members of the Chilean Constitutional Convention
Chilean LGBT politicians
People from Santiago